Johanna Elisabeth Dahlén née Morthorst (1757-1845) was a Danish stage actress and opera singer.  She belonged to the elite members of the Royal Danish Theatre between 1784 and 1827.

She made her debut as an actress on 21 September 1784.  While active as an actress her entire career, it was in the capacity of an opera singer she was truly successful.  She was described as a musically gifted coloratura soprano.  She successfully performed the role of ingenue until she gradually shifted to mother roles.

List of roles

1780s
 1782	Den stundesløse as Ane, kokkepige
 1783	Den politiske kandestøber as Pige
 1783	Faderen as Sypige
 1783	Julie as Jomfru
 1784	Balders død as Valkyrie
 1784	Barselstuen as Barselskonens pige
 1784	Cecilia as Anna
 1784	De samnitiske ægteskaber as Samnitisk pige
 1784	De uventede tilfælde as Emilie
 1784	Den sværmende filosof as Philamon
 1784	Det foregivne hekseri as Charlotte
 1784	Kongen og forpagteren as Mally, Richards søster
 1784	Lucile as Lisette, kammerpige
 1784	Skotlænderinden as Pige i værtshus
 1785	Arsene as Eugenia
 1785	Cecilia as Dorthe
 1785	Deucalion og Pyrrha as Pyrrha
 1785	Friskytterne og mælkepigen as Lene, mælkepige
 1785	Zemire og Azor as Fatime
 1786	Aglae as Rodope
 1786	Den foregivne lord as Irene, hans datter
 1786	Den løgnagtige tjener as Dame
 1786	Det uventede møde as Rezia
 1786	Rosenbruden i Salency as Cecilie, rosenbruden
 1787	Aglae as Aglae
 1787	Arsene as Myris
 1787	Cecilia as Lisbeth
 1787	Den falske formodning as Leonore
 1787	Den uforsigtige forsigtighed as Mirande
 1787	Fiskerne as Lise
 1787	Orfeus og Eurydice as Evrydice
 1787	Ulysses von Ithacia as Pallas
 1788	Aglae as Aglae
 1788	Det talende skilderi as Isabelle
 1788	Markedet as Grethe
 1788	Skovbyggeren as Pauline
 1789	Aglae as Aglae
 1789	Den skinsyge kone as Miss Russet
 1789	Den sværmende filosof as Claire
 1789	Desertøren as Nanatte, en bondepige
 1789	Eddikemanden og hans hjulbør as Hr. Delomers datter
 1789	Orfeus og Eurydice as Evrydice

1790s
 1790	Apotekheren og doctoren as Leonora, Stødvels datter
 1790	De to gerrige as Lucinde
 1790	Den sværmende filosof as Claire
 1790	Høstdagen as Grethe
 1790	Julie as Julie
 1790	Lucile as Lucile
 1790	Selim og Mirza as Fatme
 1790	Steffen og Lise as Lise
 1791	Aglae as Aglae
 1791	Bødkeren as Trine
 1791	De forliebte haandværksfolk as Rosine
 1791	De to gerrige as Lucinde
 1791	De to sedler as Grethe
 1791	De tre forpagtere as Trine
 1791	Elskovs magt as Dulcimano
 1791	Erast as Georgine
 1791	Købmanden i Smyrne as Amalie
 1791	Lilla as Lilla
 1791	Richard Løvehjerte as Margrethe, grevinde af Flandern
 1791	Syngesygen as Elise
 1791	Taknemlighed og utaknemlighed as Vilhelmine
 1791	Vennen af huset as Agathe
 1792	Aglae as Aglae
 1792	Arven i Marseille as Lucile
 1792	Balders Død as Nanna
 1792	De to smaa Savoyarder as Joseph
 1792	De Vonner og Vanner as Sophie
 1792	Feen Ursel as Berthe, dronning
 1792	Høstgildet as Grethe
 1792	Indianerne i England as Liddy
 1792	Kolonien as Marine
 1792	Papegøjen as Lady Amalie Bedford
 1792	Pæretræet as Claudine
 1792	Ringen as Caroline Selting
 1792	Stregen i regningen as Henriette
 1793	Borgerlykke as Mariane
 1793	De to gerrige as Lucinde
 1793	De to sedler as Grethe
 1793	De to smaa Savoyarder as Joseph
 1793	Den skinsyge kone as Miss Russet
 1793	Figaro giftermaal as Cherubin
 1793	Lilla as Lilla
 1793	Lise og Peter as Lise
 1793	Steffen og Lise as Lise
 1793	Syngesygen as Elise
 1793	Væddemaalet as Astrid
 1794	Arsene as Myris
 1794	Bødkeren as Trine
 1794	Den røde hue as Hedevig
 1794	Desertøren as Lovise
 1794	Det talende skilderi as Isabelle
 1794	Grovsmeden as Lene
 1794	Høstdagen as Marie
 1794	Kun seks retter as Fru Reinhard
 1794	Købmanden i Smyrne as Amalie
 1794	Peters bryllup as Grethe
1794	Silkeskoene as Edele 
 1795	Aftenen as Marie
 1795	Barselstuen as Kone
 1795	De forliebte haandværksfolk as Rosine
 1795	De to gerrige as Lucinde
 1795	De tre forpagtere as Trine
 1795	Den sværmende filosof as Claire
 1795	Entreprenøren i knibe as Merline
 1795	Hekserie as Frue
 1795	I oprørt vand er godt at fiske as Baroness
 1795	Kjolen fra Lyon as Rosine
 1795	Rosenbruden i Salency as Cecilie, rosenbruden
 1795	Serenaden as Lene, bondepige
 1796	Barselstuen as Kone
 1796	Dyveke as Dronning Elisabeth
 1796	Festen i Valhal as Skuld
 1796	Hemmeligheden as Lene, ung bondepige
 1796	Høstdagen as Marie
 1796	Søofficererne as Fru Wotton
 1796	Vinhøsten as Frøken von Tosberg
 1796	Virtuosen nr. 2 as Fru von Borgen
 1797	Bagtalelsens skole as Marie
 1797	De forliebte haandværksfolk as Madam Constance
 1797	Den bogstavelige udtydning as Jenny
 1797	Den snedige brevveksling as Madame Fougere
 * 1797	Fejltagelserne as Frøken Trine
 1797	Fusentasterne as Juliane
 1797	Jockeyen as Alexandrine
 1797	Modens sæder as Julie
 1797	Navnsygen as Henriette
 1797	Nonnerne as Priorinde
 1797	Vestindianeren as Charlotte Rusport
 1797	Zemire og Azor as Lisbe
 1798	Aline, dronning af Golkonda as Hyrdinde
 1798	Bagtalelsens skole as Pige hos lady Teazle
 1798	Barselstuen as Dame
 1798	Elskernes skole as Eveline
 1798	Falsk undseelse as Emmy
 1798	Figaro giftermaal as Suzanne
 1798	Mariane as Madame Derval
 1798	Pebersvenden as Grethe
 1798	Victorine as Victorine
 1799	Barselstuen as Dame
 1799	De to brødre as Mally
 1799	Falsk undseelse as Emmy
 1799	Medbejlerne as Frøken Lydia Følig
 1799	Natur røst as Suzon
 1800	Barselstuen as Barselskone
 1800	Bødkeren as Trine

1800s
 1800	De pudserlige arvinger as Emilie Falk
 1800	De to brødre as Mally
 1800	De to gerrige	Lucinde as * 1800	Den lille matros	Fulbert
 1800	Landsbyteatret as Mistress Dazzle
 1800	Min bedstemor as Miss Jenny
 1800	Negeren as Frøken Julie Decan
 1800	Optimisten as Fru Dorvil
 1800	Serenaden as Lene, bondepige
 1800	Søofficererne as Fru Wotton
 1800	Ægteskabsforslaget as Rosaline
 1801	Tjenestefolkenes skole as Kitty
 1802	Apothekeren og doctoren as Rosalia
 1802	Bagtalelsens skole as Pige hos Lady Teazle
 1802	Den lille matros as Lise
 1802	Herman von Unna as Sophie
 1802	Hjemkomsten as Signe
 1802	Mødet paa rejsen as Constanza
 1802	Octavia as Charmion
 1803	De to dage as Angelina
 1803	Kærlighed uden strømper as Grethe, Johans forlovede
 1803	Raptussen as Lady Dorset
 1803	Rosenkæderne as Fru Lundborg
 1804	Apothekeren og doctoren as Rosalia
 1804	Balders død as Valkyrie
 1804	Den logerende as Madam Søldal
 1804	Kalifen af Bagdad as Lemaide
 1804	Landsbypigen as Frøken Clare
 1804	Skatten as Lucile
 1805	De to Figaroer as Suzanne
 1805	Herman von Unna as Prinsessen af Ratibor
 1805	Syngesygen as Elise
 1806	Apothekeren og doctoren as Rosalia
 1806	En times ægteskab as Elise
 1806	Familien i Amerika as Madam Daranville
 1806	Rivalerne as Madam Orgon
 1806	Romeo og Juliette as Cecile
 1808	De to dage as Angelina
 1809	Marionetterne as Fru Saint-Phar
 1809	Sovedrikken as Abelone

1810s
 1810	Snedkeren i Lifland as Madame Merber, gæstgiverske
 1811	Apothekeren og doctoren as Rosalia
 1812	Apothekeren og doctoren as Rosalia
 1812	Herman von Unna as Prinsessen af Ratibor
 1813	De to brødre as Mally
 1813	Hamlet as Gertrud
 1814	Barselstuen as Dame / Kone
 1814	Fiskerne as Birthe
 1814	Natur røst as Claire
 1815	Ariadne på Naxos as Orkade
 1815	Grovsmeden as Grethe
 1815	Herman von Unna as Prinsessen af Ratibor
 1816	Den lille matros as Mo'er Thomas
 1816	Hemmeligheden as Sophie
 1817	Octavia as Kleopatra
 1819	Nonnerne as Priorinde
 1819	Peters bryllup as Kirsten

1820s
 1820	Barselstuen as 	Arianke Bogtrykkers
 1820	De forliebte haandværksfolk as Madam Constance
 1821	Den lille matros as Mo'er Thomas
 1822	Ægteskabsskolen as Fru Silkeborg
 1823	Hekserie as Frue
 1823	Sovedrikken as Abelone
 1826	Myndlingerne as Enke
 1827	Det sidste middel as Baronesse Düthelm

Personal life 
Dahlén married Carl Dahlén in 1792.

References

   	Dansk biografisk Lexikon / IV. Bind. Clemens - Eynden

1757 births
1845 deaths
18th-century Danish actresses
18th-century Danish women opera singers
19th-century Danish actresses
Danish stage actresses
19th-century Danish women opera singers